Noctcaelador (from Latin nocturnus "nocturnal", caelum "sky", and adorare "to adore") is a psychological construct, introduced by the psychologist William E. Kelly in 2003 to describe an "emotional attachment to, or adoration of, the night sky".

According to Kelly, "noctcaelador has been associated with higher openness to experience, investigative and artistic vocational interests, sensation-seeking, a rational, cognitive approach to problem solving and need for cognition, a propensity to engage in fantasy, a tendency to become deeply involved and attentive to stimuli of interest, and a willingness to consider unusual ideas and possibilities".

History
In a series of lectures in the United States, the philosopher George Santayana used the appearance of the night sky as an example of what is attractive to the human mind: an intricacy delicately poised between unfathomable complexity and uninteresting simplicity. Because of the absence of light pollution in antiquity, stars of the sixth apparent magnitude were more widely visible by the naked eye. American philosopher Holmes Rolston III juxtaposed the ancient aesthetics of the night sky and the modern one: "Today, we are almost amused at the way the ancients fancied various constellations there. At night, we no longer admire the Orion as a hunter, any more than by day do we admire a cumulus cloud as a basket of washing".

Isaac Asimov in his short story Nightfall (1941) tackled the first experience of the night sky by describing an eclipse on a fictitious inhabited planet with six suns.

See also
Dark-sky movement
National Dark-Sky Week
International Dark-Sky Association

References

Aesthetic beauty
Amateur astronomy
Observational astronomy
Pleasure
Mental states
2000s neologisms